The Order of Civil Merit is one of South Korea's orders of merit. It is awarded by the President of South Korea for "outstanding meritorious services in the area of politics, economy, society, education, art or science in the interest of improving citizens' welfare and promoting national development."

Grades
The Order of Civil Merit is divided into five grades.

Notable recipients
Jeon Tae-il (2020)
Hwang Hye-seong (1986)
Tom Kim
Benjamin W. Lee
Ilchi Lee
Kevin O'Donnell
Younghi Pagh-Paan (2007)
Park Mok-wol (1972)
Sohn Kee-chung
Jarl Wahlström (1983)

References

External links

1951 establishments in South Korea
Orders, decorations, and medals of South Korea
Orders of merit
Awards established in 1951